Perfluorodecyltrichlorosilane, also known as FDTS, is a colorless liquid chemical with molecular formula C10H4Cl3F17Si. FDTS molecules form self-assembled monolayers. They form covalent silicon–oxygen bonds to free hydroxyl (–OH) groups, such as the surfaces of glass, ceramics, or silica.

Due to its heavily fluorinated tail group, a FDTS monolayer reduces surface energy. Deposition of a FDTS monolayer is achieved by a relatively simple process, also known as molecular vapor deposition (MVD) It usually deposits from a vapor phase, at room to near-to-room temperatures (50 °C) and is thus compatible with most substrates. The process is usually carried out in a vacuum chamber and assisted by the presence of water vapor. Treated surfaces have water repellent and friction reducing properties.

For this reason, a FDTS monolayer is often applied to movable microparts of microelectromechanical systems (MEMS). A FDTS monolayer reduces surface energy and prevents sticking, so they are used to coat micro- and nano-features on stamps for a nanoimprint lithography which is becoming a method of choice for making electronics, organic photodiodes, microfluidics and other.

Reduced surface energy is helpful for reduction of ejection force and demolding of polymer parts in an injection molding and FDTS coating was applied onto some metallic injection molding molds and inserts.

References
 Ruben B. A. Sharpe, Dirk Burdinski, Jurriaan Huskens, Harold J. W. Zandvliet, David N. Reinhoudt, and Bene Poelsema, Chemically Patterned Flat Stamps for Microcontact Printing, Journal of the American Chemical Society 2005 127 (29), 10344-10349.
 Ashurst, W. R., Carraro, C., and Maboudian, R., “Vapor Phase Anti-Stiction Coatings for MEMS,” IEEE Transactions on Device and Materials Reliability, Vol. 3, No. 4, pp. 173–178, 2003. doi: 10.1109/TDMR.2003.821540

Organofluorides
Thin films
Organosilicon compounds